Shirur  is a village in the southern state of Karnataka, India. It is located in the Kundgol taluk of Dharwad district.

See also
 Dharwad
 Districts of Karnataka

References

External links
 http://www.Dharwad.nic.in/

Villages in Dharwad district